Raj Banshi Mahto  is an Indian politician. He is currently member of Bihar Assembly from Cheriya Bariyapur Vidhan Sabha. He was elected to the Lok Sabha, the lower house of the Parliament of India from the Balia in Bihar as a member of the Rashtriya Janata Dal.

References

External links
Official biographical sketch in Parliament of India website

Rashtriya Janata Dal politicians
India MPs 1998–1999
Janata Dal politicians
Bihar MLAs 2020–2025
Lok Sabha members from Bihar
1955 births
Living people